Seven Generations Education Institute is an Aboriginal-owned and controlled post-secondary institution co-founded by the ten bands in the Rainy Lake Tribal area in 1985. The ten bands are: Big Grassy, Big Island, Couchiching, Lac La Croix, Naicatchewenin, Nigigoonsiminikaaning, Ojibways of Onigaming, Rainy River, Seine River and Mitaanjigamiing. Each of the ten bands appointed one member to a board of directors of Seven Generations Education Institute, which functions with the leadership of the Executive Director.

Aboriginal institutes partner with colleges and universities to offer students degree programs, apprenticeships, certificate programs and diploma programs. Seven Generations was founded to provide greater access to post-secondary education for Aboriginal peoples. It delivers post-secondary programs approved by the Ministry of Training, Colleges and Universities. The educational curriculum was adapted to meet the needs of Aboriginal learners to ensure it reflects community needs, cultural heritage and identity.

Campus

Fort Frances Main Campus is 1455 Idylwild Drive Nanicost Complex P.O. Box 297 Fort Frances, ON P9A 3M6. The Thunder Bay Office is 409 George St., Main Floor Thunder Bay, ON P7E 5Y9. The Kenora Office is 240 Veteran's Drive Kenora, ON P9N 3X7.

History
The Rainy Lake Ojibway Education Authority was founded in 1985; Its initial role was one of an advisory capacity since college and university programs were offered through agreements with public colleges and universities. The Rainy Lake Ojibway Education Authority officially changed its name to Seven Generations Education Institute effective July 1, 1999.

Seven Generations provides educational instruction at the secondary, post-secondary and vocational levels. Students consist of adults seeking skill training and adult returnees who wish to gain knowledge in specific course content or a secondary school graduation diploma in preparation for Post-Secondary Education.

Partnerships

Seven Generations offers programs and courses of study in partnership with all levels of government; commissions; industries; commerce and other education and training institutions.

As of 2013, Seven Generations has partnered with the Rainy River District School Board, the Ministry of Education, and local First Nations’ communities in development of new technologies and programs for revitalization of the Ojibwe language.

Programs offered

University
Aboriginal Teacher Education Program
Honours Bachelor of Social Work
Bachelor of Arts (University Degree Program)
Master of Social Work 2013

College
Andaa Wiinjigewin
Culinary Skills - Chef Certificate
Indigenous Wellness and Addictions Certificate/Diploma Program
Personal Support Worker

Continuing Education
Indigenous Preparatory Studies.

Scholarships & Bursaries
The Government of Canada sponsors an Aboriginal Bursaries Search Tool that lists over 680 scholarships, bursaries, and other incentives offered by governments, universities, and industry to support Aboriginal post-secondary participation. Seven Generations scholarships for Aboriginal, First Nations and Métis students include: Sandra Kakeeway Memorial Bursary; Biskaabiyang Bursaries.

See also

Anishinaabe language dialects

References

External links
 7generations.org
Adult Learner Friendly Institutions Canada

1985 establishments in Ontario
Educational institutions established in 1985
First Nations education
Indigenous universities and colleges in North America
Universities and colleges in Ontario